Events from the year 1998 in Jordan.

Incumbents
Monarch: Hussein 
Prime Minister: Abdelsalam al-Majali (until 20 August), Fayez al-Tarawneh (starting 20 August)

Events

Establishments

 Maktoob.

See also

 Years in Iraq
 Years in Syria
 Years in Saudi Arabia

References

 
1990s in Jordan
Jordan
Jordan
Years of the 20th century in Jordan